The 2011 Arab Cup U-20 was the 1st edition of the Arab Cup U-20. It was hosted by Morocco. Ten teams from the region took part, divided into two groups of five teams. The group winners both advance to the final.

Morocco won the competition by defeating Saudi Arabia in the final.

Teams
10 teams for U-20 participated in the tournament.

Venues
Rabat
Kénitra

Group stage

Group A

Group B

Final

Winners

References

External links
2011 Arab Youth Championship at Goalzz
Details in FUTBOL24

Arab Cup U-20
Arab Nations Cup, 2011
International association football competitions hosted by Morocco
Arab
Arab
2011 in youth association football